Samalkota Mandal is one of the 21 mandals in Kakinada district of Andhra Pradesh. As per census 2011, there are 1 town 17 villages.

Demographics 
Samalkota Mandal has total population of 137,979 as per the Census 2011 out of which 68,663 are males while 69,316 are females and the average Sex Ratio of Samalkota Mandal is 1,010. The total literacy rate of Samalkota Mandal is 69.39%. The male literacy rate is 64.9% and the female literacy rate is 59.66%.

Towns & Villages

Towns 

Samalkota (Municipality)

Villages 
 Achampeta
 Boyanapudi
 G.Medapadu
 Jaggammagaripeta
 Kapavaram
 Koppavaram
 Madhavapatnam
 Mamilladoddi
 Navara
 P.Vemavaram
 Panasapadu
 Pandravada
 Pavara
 Pedabrahmadevam
 Unduru
 Valluru
 Venkata Krishnarayapuram
 Vetlapalem

See also 
List of mandals in Andhra Pradesh

References 

Mandals in Kakinada district
Mandals in Andhra Pradesh